Gili Cohen (born June 19, 1991) is an Israeli retired Olympic judoka. In 2013, she won the silver medal at the European U23 Championships, and she was a bronze medalist at the 2014 European Judo Championships. She competed for Israel at the 2020 Summer Olympics.

Judo career
Cohen has been Israeli judo champion in the U52kg category seven times in a row - from 2011 through to 2017. She won a bronze medal in the 2009 Maccabiah Games.

In 2013, she won the silver medal at the European U23 Championships. She won the bronze medal at the 2013 Moscow Grand Slam, and the gold medal at the 2014 Tbilisi Grand Prix. She was the bronze medalist at the 2014 European Judo Championships in Montpellier.

Cohen won the gold medal at the 2016 Baku Grand Slam, beating Asian Championships silver medalist Ma Yingnan of China in the semi-final and defeating world number 12 Odette Giuffrida of Italy in the final. She also won the bronze medals at the 2016 Samsun Grand Prix and the 2016 Almaty Grand Prix.

Cohen competed for Israel at the 2016 Summer Olympics, while she was ranked 9th in the world judo ranking. She lost to Christianne Legentil of Mauritius in the Women's 52 kg tournament.

In April 2017, she won the silver medal at the Antalya Grand Prix in the Women's 52 kg.

At the 2017 Maccabiah Games, Cohen won the gold medal in the under-52 kg judo event.

In 2021, she won the silver medal in her event at the Tel Aviv Grand Slam. later that year, Cohen won a bronze medal in her event at the Antalya Grand Slam.

After a long contest with Gefen Primo, Cohen was chosen to represent Israel at the 2020 Summer Olympics in the women's 52 kg weight category.In her first match, Cohen beat Turkmenistan's Gülbadam Babamuratowa by ippon. At the round of 16, She lost to Belgian two-time European champion Charline Van Snick, ending her part in the individual competition.

Titles
Source:

References

External links

 
 
 
 
 Gili Cohen at the European Judo Union
 

1991 births
Living people
Israeli female judoka
Judoka at the 2015 European Games
European Games competitors for Israel
Judoka at the 2016 Summer Olympics
Olympic judoka of Israel
Maccabiah Games medalists in judo
Maccabiah Games gold medalists for Israel
Maccabiah Games bronze medalists for Israel
Competitors at the 2009 Maccabiah Games
Competitors at the 2017 Maccabiah Games
Judoka at the 2020 Summer Olympics